The Great Santa Claus Switch is a musical Christmas special featuring Jim Henson's Muppets. It first aired on CBS on December 20, 1970, as an episode of The Ed Sullivan Show. It was directed by John Moffitt, written by Jerry Juhl, with music by Joe Raposo and puppets by Don Sahlin.

Plot

The special, narrated by Ed Sullivan, begins at the North Pole with Santa Claus and his Christmas Elves getting ready for another Christmas. However, Cosmo Scam has hatched a plan to kidnap Santa and take his place. As part of the plan, Cosmo plans to abduct Santa's Christmas Elves one by one and replace them with his evil henchmen.

Cast
 Art Carney as Santa Claus, Cosmo Scam
 Ed Sullivan as himself

Muppet performers
 Jim Henson as Fred the Christmas Elf, Lothar
 Frank Oz as Thig, Boppity, Hoppity the Christmas Elf, Snerf 
 Jerry Nelson as Thog, Snivelly, Zippity the Christmas Elf
 Richard Hunt as Bing the Christmas Elf, Matchbox Frackle, Guard Frackle
 Fran Brill as Green Bird Frackle
 John Lovelady as Alarm Frackle, Bong the Christmas Elf, Scoff, Snake Frackle, Snerf
 Danny Seagren as Gloat, Snarl (early Gonzo), Skippity the Christmas Elf, Snerf
 Greg Antonacchi as Gloat

Additional Muppets performed by Cary Antebi, John Byrum, Marilyn Sokol, and Byron Whiting.

Songs
 "We're Happy Little Christmas Elves"
 "I Want to Help"
 "It's Christmas Time"
 "Rock Music"
 "It's Christmas Time (Reprise)"

References

External links
 Muppet Wiki: The Great Santa Claus Switch
 

Christmas television specials
CBS television specials
1970 television specials
Santa Claus in television
The Muppets television specials
Television shows written by Jerry Juhl
American Christmas television specials